Greetings is a 1968 American black comedy film co-written and directed by Brian De Palma. A satirical film about men avoiding the Vietnam War draft, it features a young Robert De Niro in his first major role.

It was the first American film to receive an X rating by the Motion Picture Association of America (MPAA), although it was later given an R rating.

De Niro reprised the character of Jon Rubin in the 1970 film Hi, Mom!, also directed by De Palma. The film was entered into the 19th Berlin International Film Festival, where it won a Silver Bear award.

Greetings is an episodic film about three friends: Paul, a shy love-seeker, Lloyd, a vibrant conspiracy nut and Jon, a peeping tom and aspiring filmmaker. The film satirizes free love, the Kennedy assassination, the Vietnam War and amateur filmmaking.

Cast

Reception
Howard Thompson of The New York Times wrote: "Some of it is amusing, as when one of the lads is coached in the technique of draft-dodging. Most of it is strained and unfunny, with some generous nudity for nudity's sake and a hip sprinkling of four-letter words." Variety wrote that the film "has its sluggish sequences" but "[m]uch of the production has a freshness that is infectious." Kevin Thomas of the Los Angeles Times called it "the funniest film since The Producers—and stylistically its superior. It has the fresh and uninhibited wit of the best of the student films yet has the grace and control to sustain itself throughout its 88 minutes." Roger Ebert of the Chicago Sun-Times awarded the film three stars and wrote: "What holds the film together is not its plot (there isn't one) but its attitude, its general instinct for what is funny in our society."

See also
 List of American films of 1968

References

External links
 
 
 
 
 

1968 films
1968 comedy-drama films
1960s black comedy films
1960s English-language films
1960s satirical films
American black comedy films
American comedy-drama films
American political comedy-drama films
American political satire films
Films about conspiracy theories
Films directed by Brian De Palma
Films set in New York City
1960s American films